The 2015–16 season was the 91st season of competitive football in Poland.

League competitions

Ekstraklasa

Regular season

Championship round

Relegation round

Polish Cup

Polish SuperCup

Polish clubs in Europe

Lech Poznań

2015–16 UEFA Champions League

2015–16 UEFA Europa League

Legia Warsaw
2015–16 UEFA Europa League

Jagiellonia Białystok
2015–16 UEFA Europa League

Śląsk Wrocław
2015–16 UEFA Europa League

National teams

Poland national team

Notes and references